Epicephala laeviclada is a moth of the family Gracillariidae first described by Hou-Hun Li in 2015. It is found in the Chinese provinces of Guangxi and Hainan.

The length of the forewings is 5−7.5 mm. The forewings are brown to dark brown with three white striae from the costal ,  and  extending obliquely outward to  the width of the forewing. The dorsum has a broad white band along the basal , serrated on the upper edge, distally with a stria extending obliquely outward to the middle of the cell, with a small triangular white spot and an obliquely outward stria at the middle and before . There is a narrow silvery-white fascia with metallic reflection from the costal  to the dorsum and the distal  is ochreous, with a central black spot edged by a white dot near the costa and a white band along the dorsum. The hindwings are greyish brown.

The larva feeds on seeds in the fruit of Phyllanthus microcarpus.

Etymology
The species name refers to individuals of the host plant having glabrous branches and is derived from Latin laevis (meaning smooth) and cladus (meaning branch).

References

Epicephala
Moths described in 2015